Lamine Diakite is an Ivorian footballer, who plays as a midfielder. he play for Association sportive des Forces armées royales .

References

Ivorian footballers
1991 births
Living people
Ivorian expatriate footballers
Expatriate footballers in Morocco
Ivorian expatriate sportspeople in Morocco
Difaâ Hassani El Jadidi players
Fath Union Sport players
Botola players
Association football midfielders